George Stevenson, LL.D. (7 August 1763; 5 April 1825) was a 19th-century Anglican priest in Ireland.

He was born in Egham and educated at King's College, Cambridge. He was an assistant master at Eton from 1788 to 1796 when he became Rector of St James Garlickhythe in the City of London. He was Dean of Kilfenora from 1802 until his death.

His daughter Harriet Stevenson married Lieut. General Charles Turner (1779-1854), of the 19th Regiment of Foot, who died in 1854, aged 75, at Sutton Lodge, Chiswick, Middlesex. The mural monument to her 10th son Capt. Henry Whichcote Turner (1829-1856), survives in All Saints Church Dickleburgh, Norfolk. He died aged 27 of disease during the Crimean War and was buried in the graveyard of the Highland Division at Kamara in the Crimea.

References

Alumni of King's College, Cambridge
Fellows of King's College, Cambridge
Deans of Kilfenora
1763 births
1825 deaths
18th-century English Anglican priests
19th-century Irish Anglican priests
Deaths from typhoid fever
People from Egham